Driendl is a surname. Notable people with the surname include:

Andreas Driendl (born 1986), German ice hockey player
Thomas Georg Driendl (1849–1916), German-born Brazilian painter, architect, and art restorer